Sisiwa (Hispanicized spelling Sisihua) is a  mountain in the Wansu mountain range in the Andes of Peru. It is situated in the Apurímac Region, Antabamba Province, Oropesa District. Sisiwa lies east of Hatun Qillqa and Yuraq Urqu.

References 

Mountains of Peru
Mountains of Apurímac Region